The Budweiser 500K was an automobile race sanctioned by CART, it was held at Riverside International Raceway in Riverside, California. The event was held from 1967 to 1969 and again from 1981 to 1983.

Racing History

1967-1969
From 1967 to 1969 Riverside served as the season-ending USAC championship race, the 1967 race was the last for Jim Clark in USAC before his death in April 1968. The race was replaced by the California 500 at Ontario Motor Speedway for 1970.

1981-1983
After Ontario Motor Speedway closed in 1980, Riverside returned in 1981 as a CART event. The series dropped Riverside in 1984.

Past winners

1983: Race postponed from Sunday to Monday due to rain.

References

Champ Car races
Recurring sporting events established in 1967
Recurring sporting events disestablished in 1969
Recurring sporting events established in 1981
Recurring sporting events disestablished in 1983